Acalolepta punctifrons is a species of beetle in the family Cerambycidae. It was described by Charles Joseph Gahan in 1894. It is known from Malaysia, India, and Myanmar.

References

Acalolepta
Beetles described in 1894